Kent State Golden Flashes basketball may refer to either of the basketball teams that represent Kent State University:

Kent State Golden Flashes men's basketball
Kent State Golden Flashes women's basketball